The 2001 World Aquatics Championships or the 9th FINA World Swimming Championships were held in Fukuoka, Japan between 16 July and 29 July 2001.

The opening and closing ceremonies, as well as the swimming and synchronised swimming events, were held at Marine Messe, an indoor multi-purpose facility. The temporary 50-m pool with 10,000 seats on three sides
cost US$4 million for the two-week period. The Fukuoka Prefectural Pool hosted the diving events, with open water swimming taking place at Momochi Beach. Water polo was held at two locations: the men's competition took place at Hakata-no-Mori Center Court and the women's event at the Nishi Civic Pool Complex.

Medal table

Results

Diving

Men

Women

Open water swimming

Men

Women

Swimming

Men

Women

1In accordance with the decision of the FINA Bureau (2001, Bangkok): “To avoid any reasonable doubt regarding the result of the Women’s relay 4x200m Freestyle Final of the 9th FINA World Championships in Fukuoka but without unfairly changing the official results of the race, the Bureau decided to grant a second set of gold medals to the USA team." The members of the USA team were: Natalie Coughlin, Diana Munz, Cristina Teuscher, Julie Hardt (7:58.13).

Synchronised swimming

Water polo
Men

Women

References

External links
FINA Official Website
 Swim Rankings results

 
A
W
A
FINA World Aquatics Championships
A
World Aquatics Championships